Corambidae is a family name for sea slugs, dorid nudibranchs, marine gastropod molluscs.

Genera
Genera in the family Corambidae include:  
 Corambe Bergh, 1869
 Loy  Martynov, 1994

References